Atléticos de San Germán is a basketball club of the Baloncesto Superior Nacional (BSN) based in San Germán, Puerto Rico.

Founded in the 1930s after the amalgamation of the old San Germán team and the Farmacia Martín team, the team is one of the original BSN franchises. The Athletics play their home games at the Arquelio Torres Ramírez Coliseum. The franchise's fourteen championships are tied with the Leones de Ponces for the second most of any BSN franchise, and account for 16.8% of all BSN championships since the league's tournaments began in 1930. This makes the "Atléticos de San Germán" the most successful basketball club to date of all professional sports franchises in the western part of Puerto Rico and the town itself is known as "La cuna del baloncesto en Puerto Rico" (the cradle of basketball in Puerto Rico).

Their mascot "The Orange Monster" is a part of the team's image, featuring prominently in its logo and being the club nickname for decades. The team's nickname is "El monstruo anaranjado" "The Orange Monster")

The Athletics rise again after struggling through the 1950s, 1960s and 1970s to win a championship in 1985 over the Mets de Guaynabo. Following the 1985 championship, San Germán began to develop many young, talented players who would later lead them to three more championships within the next twelve years.

History

During the 1930s and 40s the team was undoubtedly the best in the league, winning ten championships between 1932 and 1950, including many by local basketball legend Arquelio Torres Ramírez. Torres Ramírez is fondly remembered as "El Pequeño Titán" (The little titan) and is still San Germán's most notorious player. After his sudden death in 1949, the team went in a downwards spiral; making several finals appearances but failing to win a championship until the aforementioned one in 1985. The first title after 1985 came in 1991 when development of the talented young players peaked. Under the guidance and stellar play of José "Piculín" Ortíz the "Atléticos" won their second championship in six years. The 1991 team, however was quite different from the '85 team. It was very young (with the exception of Ortíz) and for that reason it had received, during the latter years of the 80's decade, the nickname of "Los Nenes" (The boys or "The kids"). It included Eddie Casiano, Nelson Quiñones, Luis Allende, Yan Garcia and Oscar Santiago, the core of the Atléticos who won the championship in 1994.

Soon after, public feuds between Ortíz and the team owner led the star center to move to Europe to play in Greece.  The young players then reaching the height of their careers then won another championship for San Germán.  In 1997, Eddie Casiano carried the team to victory over an underdog Carolina team. The great play of Quiñones and Casiano led San Germán to their league leading 14th championship.

A change of ownership and more disputes eventually led San Germán to trade Eddie Casiano to the Leones de Ponce. Ortíz returned from Europe, but was then traded to the Cangrejeros de Santurce. Both players have won championships with their respective teams while San Germán is still in the hunt for the 15th championship.

Players

Current roster

Depth chart

Notable players

 Tu Holloway 
 O. J. Mayo
 Alpha Bangura
 Earl Barron
 Eddie Casiano
Norris Cole
José Ortiz 
Paris Bass

References

External links
Puerto Rican League official website 

Basketball teams established in 1930
BSN teams
1930 establishments in Puerto Rico